The Democratic Socialist Coalition (CSD) was a Cuban political coalition, led by Fulgencio Batista. The party was founded in 1939, and served for the 1940 general elections, won by Batista. 
The founding parties and members were four: the Liberal Party (liberal), the Nationalist Union Party (conservative), the Communist Revolutionary Union (communist), and the Democratic National Association (conservative).

The Coalition won 36 of 162 Deputies, against the 45 of Opposition Front.
In the 1944 election, the coalition supported the presidential candidacy of Carlos Saladrigas Zayas as President and Ramón Zaydín as Vice President. However, the election was won by Ramón Grau San Martín.

In the 1954 elections, the CSD ran as the National Progressive Coalition.

References

External links

Defunct political parties in Cuba
Political parties established in 1940
Political party alliances in Cuba
Socialist parties in Cuba